Will Mercer Cook (March 30, 1903 – October 4, 1987), popularly known as Mercer Cook, was a diplomat and professor. He was the first American ambassador to the Gambia after it became independent, appointed in 1965 while also still serving as ambassador to Senegal. He was also the second American ambassador to Niger.

Biography

Will Mercer Cook was born on March 30, 1903, in Washington D.C., to Will Marion Cook, a famous composer of musical theatre, and Abbie Mitchell Cook, a soprano singer. She became best known for playing the role of "Clara" in the premier production of George Gershwin's Porgy and Bess (1935). Cook's sister, and only sibling, was born Marion Abigail Cook in 1900. As a child, Cook traveled extensively in the United States and Europe with his parents as they pursued their respective careers in the entertainment industry. They placed their daughter to be raised by family because of their performance schedules. In Washington, DC, the Cook family lived across the street from the legendary jazz musician Duke Ellington.

Cook attended Dunbar High School in Washington D.C., a predominantly black academic school. He graduated from Amherst College with a bachelor's degree in 1925 and went to Paris for further study. He received his teacher's diploma from the University of Paris in 1926.

After his return, in 1929, Cook married Vashti Smith, a social worker. The couple had two sons, named Mercer and Jacques.

Cook earned a master's degree in French from Brown University in 1931 and a doctorate in 1936. He returned to Paris in 1934, on a fellowship from the General Education Board.
 
While completing his graduate education, Cook worked as an assistant professor of romance languages at Howard University from 1927 until 1936. Upon completing his doctorate, Cook became a professor of French at Atlanta University, serving from 1936 until 1943. During that time, he received a Rosenwald Fellowship to study in Paris and the French West Indies. In 1942, he received another General Education Board Fellowship to the University of Havana. From 1943 to 1945, Cook worked as a professor of English at the University of Haiti. During this time, he wrote the Handbook for Haitian Teachers of English. He also wrote the literary criticism titled Five French Negro Authors and edited an anthology of Haitian readings.

After two years in Haiti, Cook returned to Washington, D.C., to work as a professor of romance languages at Howard University, where he stayed until 1960. During this time, Cook continued to write about Haiti, and he also translated works of African and West Indian writers from French to English. Most notably, in 1959, Cook translated the works of Leopold Senghor, who was a former president of Senegal and an established French author.

Ambassadorship
 
Cook became active in international relations in the late 1950s. From 1958 to 1960, he served as a foreign representative for the American Society of African Culture. The following year, he worked as the director of the African program for the Congress of Cultural Freedom. 

In 1961, President John F. Kennedy appointed Cook as the U.S. ambassador to Niger. Niger was a French colony that had achieved independence in 1960. Cook's duties as ambassador included overseeing U.S. economic aid programs in the country, administering the Peace Corps, and supervising U.S. information and cultural activities in the country. His wife was also involved in many social programs, including a project to distribute medical supplies across the country and participation in women's groups. 
 
In 1963, Cook was also designated as an alternate delegate to the General Assembly of the United Nations. He served as the United States Ambassador to Niger until 1964.

In 1966, Cook returned to Howard University to become head of the department of romance languages. He worked as a visiting professor at Harvard University in 1969.
 
In 1969, Cook published The Militant Black Writer in Africa and the United States, co-authored with Stephen Henderson of Morehouse College. The book consisted of expanded versions of speeches delivered by the two men at a 1968 conference in Madison, Wisconsin, called "'Anger and Beyond:' The Black Writer and a World in Revolution." In his essay, Cook described a half-century tradition of protest among African poets and novelists. Cook concluded his essay by stating: "In the main, statements by the Africans seem to me less extreme and violent than many by West Indian and North American blacks."
 
Cook retired from academia in 1970. He continued to write and publish professionally in the 1970s. Cook died of pneumonia in Washington, D.C., on October 4, 1987.

Awards
 
John W. Simpson Fellowship, 1925–26 
General Education Board Fellowship, 1934, 1942
Rosenwald Fellowship, 1938
Received decorations from the Government of Haiti, 1945, the Republic of Niger, 1964, and Senegal, 1966 
Palmes Academiques, France; LL.D., Amherst College, 1965; LL.D., Brown University, 1970.

Memberships
Association for the Study of Negro Life and History
American Society of Composers, Authors, and Publishers
American Association of Teachers of French
Académie des Sciences Morales et Politiques
National Association for the Advancement of Colored People
Phi Beta Kappa
Omega Psi Phi

References

Ambassadors of the United States to Senegal
Ambassadors of the United States to the Gambia
Ambassadors of the United States to Niger
1903 births
1987 deaths
Academics from Washington, D.C.
African-American diplomats
Dunbar High School (Washington, D.C.) alumni
Amherst College alumni
Brown University alumni
Howard University faculty
20th-century African-American people